is a female wrestler from Hachinohe, Aomori, Japan. She is Captain in the Japan Ground Self-Defense Force.
On 8 August 2012, Obara won the women's 48kg freestyle wrestling gold in her first Olympic Games at London's Excel Arena.

Awards
Tokyo Sports
Wrestling Special Award (2000, 2001, 2005, 2006, 2011, 2012)

References

External links
 bio on fila-wrestling.com

Japanese female sport wrestlers
Living people
1981 births
Japan Ground Self-Defense Force personnel
Wrestlers at the 2012 Summer Olympics
Olympic gold medalists for Japan
Sportspeople from Aomori Prefecture
People from Hachinohe
Olympic medalists in wrestling
Olympic wrestlers of Japan
Asian Games medalists in wrestling
Wrestlers at the 2010 Asian Games
Medalists at the 2012 Summer Olympics
Recipients of the Medal with Purple Ribbon

World Wrestling Championships medalists
Asian Games bronze medalists for Japan
Medalists at the 2010 Asian Games
Asian Wrestling Championships medalists
21st-century Japanese women